A Cross the Universe is a 2008 documentary film about the French electronic music duo Justice, directed by Romain Gavras, So Me and Justice themselves. The film was released alongside a live album of the same name.

Background
The film follows Justice's March 2008 North American tour. The documentary is directed by Romain Gavras, So Me and the band themselves. The documentary is meant to cover fewer of the band's live shows, and more of their personal experience touring.

The live portion of this release was recorded at a concert in San Francisco, California at the Concourse Exhibition Center, on March 27, 2008.

DVD song credits

Reception
Reception of the film has been positive.

Justine JC of Scene Crave wrote, "The cinematography is artistic and raw, yet deft, making the mess of a story line (well, lack there of …) strangely engaging. The film is literally an arbitrary compilation of the people and events involved in the band's tour."

References

External links
 

2008 films
Documentary films about electronic music and musicians
Justice (band)
2000s French-language films
French musical films
2000s French films